Craspedoderus dilaticollis is a species of beetle in the family Cerambycidae, and the only species in the genus Craspedoderus. It was described by Thomson in 1864.

References

Apomecynini
Beetles described in 1864
Monotypic Cerambycidae genera